Turnberry may refer to:

Place

Canada 
 Morris-Turnberry, Ontario, a municipality in Huron County, Ontario, Canada

United States 
 Turnberry Associates, a real estate development company based in Florida
 Turnberry Isle Resort and Club, a resort near Miami, Florida
 Turnberry Place, a residential complex in Las Vegas, Nevada
 Turnberry Towers, residential complex in Las Vegas, Nevada

United Kingdom 
 Turnberry, South Ayrshire, a village in South Ayrshire, Scotland, and location where the Battle of Turnberry was fought
 Battle of Turnberry, 1307 battle
 Turnberry Castle, ruins of a former castle in Ayrshire, Scotland
 Turnberry Estate, a residential area in Bloxwich, West Midlands, England
 Turnberry railway station, a railway station in Ayrshire, Scotland serving the Turnberry Resort
 Turnberry (golf course), a golf resort in South Ayrshire, Scotland
 Turnberry Lighthouse, at Turnberry Point, South Ayrshire

See also 

 All pages beginning with "Turnberry"